Nailini Inaise Vae Helu (born 20 November 1993) is a professional boxer who lives in New Zealand.

Helu has won multiple amateur titles and has peaked at 6th on BoxRec, 6th in the WIBA, top 2 in the WBA Oceania, and 10th in the WBC, in the female professional boxing rankings.

Professional debut, controversy national title fight and first loss 2016
Helu made her pro boxing debut against Kirsty Lupeamanu for the promotion's own Inaugural Royal Rampage heavyweight title. The title was originally for the super middleweight title, however both boxers failed to make weight, so the title was upgraded to a heavyweight bout despite that the belt itself was pre-engraved for the super middleweight division. Lupeamanu was also originally scheduled to face Michelle Montague; however Montague stepped down due to focusing on amateur MMA fights instead and Helu stepped up. Helu won all rounds of the bout on all judges' scorecards for a dominant win. The bout, which was in 2016, also made history by being the first bout to have New Zealand's first female boxing referee, Shelley Ashton. This fight was on the WBC female middleweight title Kali Reis vs. Maricela Cornejo undercard. Parts of this bout was televised on the TVNZ show Fresh TV. Helu next pro fight was against Sarah Long. Long was making her pro boxing debut, however she has had 6 kickboxing bouts (3 wins 3 losses) and 1 win in Corporate boxing. Helu knocked Long down in the first round for the first first round knock-down in Helu's career. Helu won all rounds, again dominating her opponent. Shortly after the fight, it was announced that this bout was for the mandatory challenging position for the New Zealand (NZPBA version) title.

On 21 July, it was announced that Helu would face Agne Davis for the New Zealand (NZPBA version) & UBF Asia Pacific heavyweight titles on 24 September at ABA Stadium. Ange Davis making her pro boxing debut have fought in 10 kickboxing bouts (5 wins 4 losses 1 draw) and has held the TBANZ Women's middleweight title. The bout was in jeopardy where Davis suffered an ankle injury; however after  scans, the doctors were confident that Davis was be medically cleared to fight. Helu was favored to win the bout and was likely to receive a world title shot within the next year if she kept up her winning streak. The bout itself was close throughout the fight; however the fight of the night ended by a split decision win to Helu. After the bout, there was a massive backlash all across social media with people thinking Davis won the bout. The backlash got so bad that people were sending abuse to Helu, the promoter, and even to the judges themselves. On 26 September, Ange Davis and her team launched an appeal with NZPBA, due to poor judging. On 6 October, NZPBA announced that the panel looked into the scorecards of the judges and found that one of the judges incorrectly added up their card. They originally were 58/56 in favour of Helu, however when calculating the card it was indeed supposed to be 57/57, a draw, making this decision a split decision draw. The judge that made this error was stood down and regulations on all NZ title bouts have been changed. The decision of the bout was overturned to a draw, Helu had two belts to be stripped and the two were required to have a rematch with 6 months of their bout (expiring 24 March 2017) or face risk of losing their mandatory positions. On 26 December, Māori Television televised this fight on the combat show called Whawhai Fight Night. Helu was originally scheduled to fight Victoria Nansen on 8 October 2016. However, due to the backlash after the Helu vs Davis bout, there was a big toll on Helu's mental health and she was unable to take part in the bout let alone train. Kirsty Lupeamanu took on the fight on a week's notice and won by majority decision.

Helu was originally scheduled to take on Cheyenne Whaanga for the New Zealand (NZPBA version) light heavyweight Title; however due to Whaanga receiving an injury during training, Meleisea was not able to take part. Alrie Meleisea took the fight on less than a week notice.  Meleisea won the bout by a massive upset split decision.

Losing streak to the best 2017-2018
In January 2017, it was announced that Helu would have a rematch against Alrie Meleisea in March 2017 at ABA Stadium for the vacant NZPBA and UBF Asia Pacific heavyweight titles. Planning the bout was difficult for the promoter, due to the rematch clause in the Helu vs Ange Davis appeal. During training, Davis suffered a serious shoulder injury that would bring her away from the ring passed the 6 month expiry rematch clause day of 24 March. Due to this, Helu and Meleisea were allowed to fight for the vacant titles, with the winner to face Davis when she was fully healed. Helu lost the bout by a controversial split decision. Helu faced Brazil born Geovana Peres at ABA Stadium on 21 April for the NZNBF version of the New Zealand National Title. This will Helu's third New Zealand title shot of her career. Peres won the bout by unanimous decision with all three judges scoring 79-73 and becoming the first ever LGBT person to hold a New Zealand Professional Boxing Title. After being away from the ring for 64 weeks, Nailini Helu returned to professional boxing against Lani Daniels on 14 July 2018 at Auckland Netball Centre in St Johns, Auckland, New Zealand. It was announced on 6 June that the bout between the two will happen with Lani Daniels New Zealand National (NZPBA Version) Light Heavyweight title will be on the line. The two have fought before back in the amateurs multiple times. Daniels won the bout by unanimous decision.

Comeback 2022 
On 26 August 2022, Helu made her return to the ring after being away from the ring for four years. Helu took on Amateur New Zealand champion Tinta Smith for the PBCNZ South Pacific Super Flyweight title. Helu won the fight by majority decision, making this her first official title in her career.

Personal life
Helu trains at Pridelands boxing gym which is based in Otara. The gym is a community based gym that is free for everyone to use. Helu uncle Aloisio Helu, runs the gym. Helu is the older sister to Light Heavyweight boxer Panuve Helu, which is common for them to spar and train together.

Amateur boxing titles
Gold 2015 New Zealand Golden Gloves Championship Heavyweight
Gold 2015 New Zealand National Championship Heavyweight
Gold 2014 New Zealand National Championship Heavyweight
Silver 2014 New Zealand North Island Golden Gloves Championship Heavyweight
Bronze 2013 New Zealand National Championship Light Heavyweight
Silver New Zealand North Island Golden Gloves Championship Heavyweight
Gold 2012 New Zealand National Championship Light Heavyweight

Professional boxing titles
Boxing Promotions titles
Inaugural Royal Rampage Heavyweight Title (172¾Ibs)
 New Zealand Professional Boxing Commission
 South Pacific Super Middleweight title (164Ibs)

Professional boxing record

References

External links
Nailini Helu Awakening Fighters Profile

Nailini Helu Wommen Boxing Profile

1993 births
Living people
New Zealand women boxers
Boxers from Auckland
Heavyweight boxers
Tongan emigrants to New Zealand
Tongan boxers
Fighters trained by Lolo Heimuli
People from Nukuʻalofa